This is the list of episodes (Seasons 1–20) for the Food Network competition reality series'' Chopped.

Series overview

Episodes

Season 1 (2009)
This season is known for its straight-forward episode titles (listing foods found in the baskets) and the variance of basket ingredients (some rounds had three ingredients while some rounds had five ingredients).

Season 2 (2009)

Season 3 (2009–10)

Season 4 (2010)
Starting in this season, having four ingredients in every basket became the standard instead of the occasional round with five and/or three ingredients of the previous three seasons.

Season 5 (2010)

Season 6 (2011)
 This is the first season where less than 13 episodes aired.

Season 7 (2011)

Season 8 (2011)

Season 9 (2011)

Season 10 (2011–12)

Season 11 (2012)

Season 12 (2012)

Season 13 (2012–13)

Season 14 (2013)

Season 15 (2013)

Season 16 (2013)

Season 17 (2013)

Season 18 (2013–14)

Season 19 (2014)

Season 20 (2014)

See also
List of Chopped: Canada episodes

References

External links
 Chopped episode guide at FoodNetwork.com
 Chopped Junior episode guide at FoodNetwork.com

Lists of food television series episodes